Arthur Edward Adams (12 November 1908 – July 1981) was a footballer who played as an outside left in the Football League for Tranmere Rovers.

References

English footballers
Tranmere Rovers F.C. players
English Football League players
1908 births
1981 deaths
Association football wingers